Barbara Rothbaum is a psychologist at Emory University School of Medicine in Atlanta, Georgia. She is a professor in the Psychiatry department and a pioneer in the treatment of anxiety-related disorders. Rothbaum is head of the Trauma and Anxiety Recovery Program (TARP) at Emory as well as the Emory Healthcare Veterans Program. In the mid-1990s she founded a virtual exposure therapy company called Virtually Better, Inc. This company treats patients with anxiety disorders, addictions, pain, and the like using virtual reality instead of the actual place or scenario. It also allows the therapist to control the environment. She also played a key role in the development of the treatment of posttraumatic stress disorder (PTSD).

Rothbaum was president of the International Society for Traumatic Stress Studies. Her term spanned 2004 to 2005.

Bibliography
Rothbaum, B. and Foa, E.B. (1997) Treating the Trauma of Rape: Cognitive-Behavioral Therapy for PTSD (The Guilford Press)
Rothbaum, B. and Foa, E.B. (1999) Reclaiming Your Life After Rape: Cognitive-Behavioral Therapy For Posttraumatic Stress Disorder (Oxford University Press)
Rothbaum, B. (editor) (2005) Pathological Anxiety : Emotional Processing in Etiology and Treatment (The Guilford Press)
Pine, Daniel, Rothbaum, B.O, and Ressler, K. (editors) (2015) "Primer on anxiety disorders." (Oxford University Press)

See also
Cycloserine
Prolonged exposure therapy, exposure therapy for posttraumatic stress disorder
List of persons associated with Emory University
List of psychologists
List of University of North Carolina at Chapel Hill alumni

References

Sources

External links
Virtually Better, Inc
ISTSS
Emory University
Emory Healthcare
Trauma and Anxiety Recovery Program at Emory University

Living people
American neuroscientists
American women neuroscientists
Year of birth missing (living people)
Place of birth missing (living people)
21st-century American women scientists
Emory University School of Medicine faculty